Varg Ringdal Støvland (born 23 January 1996) is a Norwegian footballer who plays as a midfielder or defender for Frigg.

Hailing from Larvik, he started his youth career in Nanset and Fram before joining Sandefjord's youth section in 2013. He made his first-team debut in the 2014 Norwegian Football Cup in and his first-team league debut in 2015. In 2017, he was loaned out to Fram and Halsen, continuing in Halsen in 2018.

In 2019 he moved to Oslo and Frigg.

References

1996 births
Living people
People from Larvik
Sandefjord Fotball players
Eliteserien players
Norwegian First Division players
Association football midfielders
Norwegian footballers
Frigg Oslo FK players
Sportspeople from Vestfold og Telemark